The Scorcher is the name of two different fictional characters appearing in comic books published by Marvel Comics.

Publication history
The first version, Steven Hudak, debuted in Untold Tales of Spider-Man #1 (September 1995), and was created by Kurt Busiek and Pat Olliffe.

The second version, Sarah Garza, debuted in Secret Avengers vol. 2 #10 (October 2013), and was created by Ed Brisson and Luke Ross.

Fictional character biography

Steven Hudak

Steven Hudak was a research chemist who was wrongfully accused of embezzlement by his employer. Swearing revenge, he created an armored suit containing flame-throwing equipment and takes the name of "The Scorcher" when he attacked his former place of employment. He ran afoul of the original Spider-Man on one of the latter's first outings, and being defeated by the hero, he was sent to prison. Later, it was revealed that Hudak was not working alone but was an agent of Norman Osborn. Hudak eventually escaped prison to pursue an arson career but was defeated by Spider-Man a second time.

Hudak once attacked Christmas shoppers, only to be stopped by the second Spider-Man at the time, noting that encountering the Scorcher after so long left him feeling particularly old. Later, the second Crimson Cowl recruited Scorcher to join her incarnation of the Masters of Evil.

When Matt Murdock's identity as Daredevil was revealed, Hudak and Diamondback moved to confront Murdock, but were driven off by Daredevil and Spider-Man. The Scorcher encountered Daredevil again in the Secret War series when he was forced by Lucia von Bardas to band together with other supervillains and attack S.H.I.E.L.D. headquarters which was defended by a dozen of New York's superheroes including Daredevil. Daredevil was instrumental in the criminal's personal defeat. Soon afterwards, Hudak promised his ex-wife he would give up his criminal life soon.

The Savage Land Mutates tried hiring the Scorcher to break Sauron out of jail, but he refused. They weren't aware that the Scorcher, trying to stay on the straight and narrow path, notified Wolverine about this contact (due to the Avengers having recently disbanded). But after some time, the Scorcher returned to the criminal life, but he was defeated by She-Hulk.

During the Secret Invasion storyline, the Scorcher appears as member of the Hood's crime syndicate and attacked a Skrull force.

During the Dark Reign storyline, the Scorcher, Living Laser, Griffin, and Razor Fist are sent by the Hood to retrieve Tigra and Gauntlet after they flee from Osborn. They attack the heroes, who are ultimately saved by Counter Force. The Scorcher was with the Hood during his gang war with Mister Negative.

Hudak is seen to be among the new recruits for Camp H.A.M.M.E.R. He was sent to take back the Negative Zone based prison and apprehend rogue team the Heavy Hitters. Later, he and several of his villainous teammates are deemed failures by Norman Osborn and the group's Drill Instructor Taskmaster.

During the Spider-Island storyline, the Scorcher (alongside Chance and White Rabbit) is seen guarding an abandoned lab at Empire State University when Peter Parker and Carlie Cooper arrive. He ends up knocked down by Parker using the moves learned from Shang-Chi.

Boomerang and Owl hire the Scorcher onto the Sinister Sixteen, assembled to distract the Chameleon's forces while Boomerang steals.

During the Avengers: Standoff! storyline, Hudak was an inmate of Pleasant Hill, a gated community established by S.H.I.E.L.D. He had transformed him into firefighter with the help of Kobik.

During the Secret Empire storyline, Hudak appears as a member of Baron Helmut Zemo's Army of Evil. He participated in the Army of Evil's attack on Manhattan to draw out as many superheroes as part of Hydra's plan to take out the opposition and take over the United States.

Sarah Garza

Sarah Garza is an agent of S.H.I.E.L.D. who is from Park Slope, Brooklyn. After the Terrigen Mist, she found herself as an Inhuman who is able to generate powerful explosions of plasma energy, with her Iron Patriot armor used as a regulator suit. She is a rookie member of the Secret Avengers and uses her abilities against Thanos's forces as well as the Junkman's technopathic abilities. She resigned after seeing how violent her abilities are in combat, and is and placed in confinement by Maria Hill until she could learn to control her powers so she could return to her old job as a technician. Garza is later seen alongside Daisy Johnson and Synapse.

Powers and  abilities
Steven Hudak's suit was inspired by his flame-throwing equipment, which allows him to produce large quantities of fire under his control. His Scorcher costume protects him against heat and flame, and other injuries. Later, he added a jet pack to his armor, enabling him to fly and hover in place.

Sarah Garza's powers are that she can generate plasma energy from her body. Still, she can't control the releasing direction and has to use an Iron Patriot suit of armor to redirect as she pleases from her wrists and chest.

In other media

Video games
 The Steven Hudak version of Scorcher appears as a mini-boss in Marvel: Ultimate Alliance 2, voiced by Keith Ferguson. This version is a recurring boss. He and Wizard fight the heroes at the castle gates of Lucia von Bardas's castle. In the PSP, PS2, and Wii versions, Scorcher attacks the heroes at the portal leading out of the Negative Zone Prison alongside Electro, Grey Gargoyle, and the Lizard. In the Wii and PSP versions, Scorcher is first fought as the first boss in Latveria as well as dialogue with Wolverine and Spider-Man. On the PSP version, Scorcher is the boss of Cyclops's bonus mission.
 Sarah Garza appears in Marvel's Avengers, voiced by Anna Graves.

References

External links
 Scorcher at Marvel.com
 Scorcher at Marvel Wiki
 

Characters created by Kurt Busiek
Comics characters introduced in 1995
Fictional African-American people
Fictional chemists
Marvel Comics male supervillains
Marvel Comics scientists
Spider-Man characters